Camellia saluenensis is a species of Camellia native to southcentral China. A large bush, it is a parent of a number of garden hybrids. 'Cornish Snow' (C. cuspidata × C. saluenensis) which flowers in midwinter, and 'Inspiration' (C. reticulata × C. saluenensis) have both gained the Royal Horticultural Society's Award of Garden Merit.

References

saluenensis
Endemic flora of China
Plants described in 1933